Old Frankfort Stone High School, also known as Old Stoney, is a historic high school building in Frankfort, Clinton County, Indiana.  It was built in 1892, and is a -story, Richardsonian Romanesque style sandstone building on a raised basement.  It has Indiana limestone trim, a large round arched entrance, four large stone chimneys, and four-story corner tower with a tall conical roof.  The building was damaged by fire in 1922, and rebuilt with the work completed in 1926. The building housed a junior high school from 1962 to 1974, after which it ceased use as a public school.

It was listed on the National Register of Historic Places in 1979.  It is located in the Christian Ridge Historic District.

Since 1980, the Clinton County Historical Society and Museum has been located in on the second floor of Old Stoney.

References

External links

 Clinton County Historical Society and Museum

High schools in Indiana
School buildings on the National Register of Historic Places in Indiana
Richardsonian Romanesque architecture in Indiana
School buildings completed in 1892
Buildings and structures in Clinton County, Indiana
Museums in Clinton County, Indiana
National Register of Historic Places in Clinton County, Indiana
Historic district contributing properties in Indiana
1892 establishments in Indiana